Diocese of Taungngu or of Toungoo may refer to:

the Anglican Diocese of Toungoo (Church of the Province of Myanmar)
the Roman Catholic Diocese of Taungngu